Whitley Bridge railway station serves the villages of Eggborough and Whitley in North Yorkshire, England.

Facilities
The station is unmanned and has only basic amenities – no permanent buildings remain other than standard glass and metal shelters on each platform.  There is a single customer help point on platform 1 (eastbound) and timetable posters on both sides to provide train running information. No ticket facilities are provided, so passengers can buy their tickets either on the train or at their destination. Step-free access is available to both platforms via the level crossing at the Goole end of the station.

Services

Whitley Bridge has a limited service – Monday to Saturdays, one (early evening) train a day goes to Goole and two per day go to Leeds (one in the morning business peak and the other mid-evening).  There is no Sunday service.  Trains operate on Bank holidays.

The sparse timetable continues to operate mainly to meet Northern's franchise obligations and to avoid the need for the Knottingley to Goole line to be put through the formal closure process.  The line is however also used for freight traffic to/from Drax Power Station.

References

External links

Railway stations in North Yorkshire
DfT Category F2 stations
Former Lancashire and Yorkshire Railway stations
Northern franchise railway stations
Railway stations in Great Britain opened in 1848